The 14th Canadian Parliament was in session from 8 March 1922 until 5 September 1925.  The membership was set by the 1921 federal election on 6 December 1921, and it changed only somewhat due to resignations and by-elections until, due to momentary confusion among the MPs, it lost a money vote and was dissolved, causing the 1925 election.

It was controlled by a Liberal Party government under Prime Minister William Lyon Mackenzie King and the 12th Canadian Ministry.  The Official Opposition was the Conservative Party, led by Arthur Meighen, although the new Progressive Party led by Thomas Crerar had more seats.  The appearance of the Progressive Party created a three-party system in the House for the first time since the 1867 Anti-Confederation Party.

The Speaker was Rodolphe Lemieux.  See also List of Canadian electoral districts 1914-1924 for a list of the ridings in this parliament.

There were four sessions of the 14th Parliament:

List of members

Following is a full list of members of the fourteenth Parliament listed first by province, then by electoral district.

Electoral districts denoted by an asterisk (*) indicates that district was represented by two members.

Alberta

British Columbia

Manitoba

New Brunswick

Nova Scotia

Ontario

Prince Edward Island

Quebec

Saskatchewan

Yukon

By-elections

References

Succession

Canadian parliaments
1922 establishments in Canada
1925 disestablishments in Canada
1922 in Canada
1923 in Canada
1924 in Canada
1925 in Canada